Goulburn Valley Highway is a highway located in Victoria, Australia. The section north of the Hume Freeway is part of the Melbourne to Brisbane National Highway (together with Hume Freeway) and is the main link between these two cities as well as a major link between Victoria and inland New South Wales. It is also the most direct route between Melbourne and the major regional centre of Shepparton in Victoria (via the Hume Freeway).

Route
The highway roughly follows the course of the Goulburn River, a tributary of the Murray River. The Highway serves the fruit and vegetable growing areas of the Goulburn Valley in Victoria, one of Australia's most productive agricultural regions.

The highway runs from Eildon to Seymour as a two lane single carriageway sealed road with shoulders. The section from the Hume Freeway to Arcadia via Nagambie has been fully converted into a dual carriageway and has been renamed as the Goulburn Valley Freeway. The freeway upgrade has made sections of the original Goulburn Valley Highway redundant, either incorporated into the new freeway or acting as local access roads. The freeway section is covered with a speed limit of 110 km/h, the standard speed limit for rural freeways in Australia. Between Arcadia and Tocumwal the highway is a two lane single carriageway but with tactile road lines, wide shoulders and small sections of 3 or 4 lane single carriageway road for overtaking. The Goulburn Valley Highway crosses the Murray River at Tocumwal to join the Newell Highway in New South Wales.

History

The passing of the Highways and Vehicles Act of 1924 through the Parliament of Victoria provided for the declaration of State Highways, roads two-thirds financed by the State government through the Country Roads Board (later VicRoads). The Goulburn Valley Highway was declared a State Highway in the 1946/47 financial year, from Seymour via Murchison and Shepparton to Strathmerton (for a total of 88 miles); before this declaration, these road were referred to as Goulburn Valley Road, Murchison-Shepparton Road and Shepparton-Numurkah-Cobram Road. In the 1959/60 financial year, the eastern section from Eildon via Alexandra and Yea to Seymour was added, along the Upper Goulburn Road (from Eildon to Trawool, where it crossed the Goulburn River), and then along Seymour-Yea Road to Seymour. The last section, from Yarroweyah to the border with NSW just outside Tocumwal, was added in June 1983, along Benalla-Tocumwal Road north of the Murray Valley Highway. The section of the highway between Shepparton and Strathmerton was re-aligned in September 1985: from running through Numurkah and Katunga on the eastern side of the Tocumwal railway line to meet the Murray Valley Highway in Strathmerton, to its current alignment (formerly called Ancliffe Road) bypassing Numurkah on the western side of the railway to meet the Murray Valley Highway 4 kilometres west of Strathmerton; the former alignment is now known as Tocumwal Road through Numurkah, and Numurkah Road beyond to Strathmerton.

The Goulburn Valley Highway was signed as National Route 39 between Seymour and Tocumwal in 1965, and State Route 168 between Seymour and Eildon in 1986. The Whitlam Government introduced the federal National Roads Act 1974, where roads declared as a National Highway were still the responsibility of the states for road construction and maintenance, but were fully compensated by the Federal government for money spent on approved projects. As an important interstate link between the capitals of Victoria and Queensland, the Goulburn Valley Highway was declared a National Highway between Seymour and Tocumwal in 1992. With Victoria's conversion to the newer alphanumeric system in the late 1990s, this was updated to route A39 between Seymour and Tocumwal, and replaced by B340 from Seymour to Eildon. As stages of the highway north of Seymour are successively converted to freeway-standard, these sections are updated from route A39 to route M39.

The passing of the Road Management Act 2004 granted the responsibility of overall management and development of Victoria's major arterial roads to VicRoads: in 2011, VicRoads re-declared this road as Goulburn Valley Freeway (Freeway #1640), beginning in Seymour and ending in Arcadia, while re-declaring the remnants between Eildon and the border with New South Wales as Goulburn Valley Highway (Arterial #6640).

Plans to convert the highway into a freeway-standard road between Seymour and Shepparton dated from 1992, as a direct result of its declaration as a National Highway. Construction on the first section to be converted, 16 km from the interchange with the Hume Freeway in Seymour to just south of Nagambie, started in January 1999; this included the relocation of the Aboriginal Scar Tree, a dead tree bearing scars where wood had been cut for a shield or dish, in consultation with the local Taungurung Aboriginal People, and who also attended the opening ceremony in a new south-bound rest area in April 2001. The Murchison East deviation opened in February 2003 (almost eleven months early), allowing a more-direct alignment of the road instead of via Murchison East and Moorlim and shortening the distance between Melbourne and Shepparton by 4 km.

Timeline of upgrade
2001 – Hume Freeway to Nagambie, 16 km opened in April 2001, at a cost of $53 million.
2003 – Murchison East deviation, 18 km opened on 18 February 2003, at a cost of $88.9 million.
2008 – Arcadia duplication, 10 km opened in June 2008, at a cost of $40.5 million.
2013 - Nagambie bypass, 17 km bypass opened at the end of April 2013.

Arcadia duplication
The duplication was a $40.55 million project funded by the Australian Government as part of its Auslink Program. The works involved duplication of 10 km of the existing Goulburn Valley Highway between the Murchison East deviation and the proposed Shepparton Bypass, just north of Ross Road, through Arcadia. It incorporates four at-grade intersections, frontage access roads, a rest area with full facilities, and wire rope safety barriers.

The Arcadia section runs adjacent to the Calder Woodburn Memorial Avenue of Honour. A Conservation Management Plan was developed in consultation with Heritage Victoria to ensure that impact on the Avenue of Honour was minimised. The plans included measures to enhance and highlight the avenue of trees. The project was started in June 2006, open to traffic in February 2008, with final completion of all works in April 2008.

The highway carries an estimated 6,500 vehicles per day, including more than 2,000 commercial vehicles.

Nagambie bypass
The Nagambie Bypass, funded as part of the Auslink 2 (2009–2014) Federal Government infrastructure program, bypasses the town of Nagambie to the east. Funding was announced in May 2009, and construction commenced in December 2009. The bypass opened to traffic in April 2013.

Costed at $222 million, $177.6 million was contributed by the Australian Government, with the remaining $44.4 million from the State Government. The project was made up of two sections: duplicating the existing highway north of Nagambie for 3.5 km between Kirwans Bridge-Longwood Road and Moss Road (completed in November 2011), and the 13.5 km bypass road from Mitchellstown Road to Kirwans Bridge-Longwood Road.

Shepparton bypass
An alignment for the Shepparton bypass has been decided, connecting with the northern terminus of the existing Goulburn Valley Freeway in Arcadia, heading northwest to cross the Goulburn River at Toolamba, travel west and then north around Mooroopna, to rejoin the existing highway north of Congupna.

It was proposed that the Shepparton Bypass would be funded by Auslink 2 (2009–2014); the 2017/18 State Budget allocated $10.2 million over three years to undertake preparatory works and land acquisition, and a consultation was held with the community for its initial stage in 2018. The current priority is Stage 1, a single carriageway with a lane in each direction extending from the Midland Highway west of Mooroopna to the Goulburn Valley Highway via an upgraded Wanganui Road in Shepparton North, a total distance of 10 km; the Federal Government has also contributed $208 million, for an estimated project cost of $260 million for Stage 1. The project is still under planning with a date to begin construction still to be set.

Strathmerton deviation

A realignment will bypass the small townships of Strathmerton and Yarroweyah and avoid dangerous bends south of the Murray River crossing at Tocumwal. The proposed new route will cross the Murray Valley Highway instead of follow it through those towns, and rejoin the current route just south of the Murray River.

The proposed Strathmerton Deviation was also to be funded by Auslink 2 (2009–2014) but had also not been constructed by the beginning of 2017.

Major intersections and towns

VIC/NSW border - Seymour

Seymour - Eildon

See also

 Highways in Australia
 Highways in Victoria
 Freeways in Australia
 Freeways in Victoria

References

Highways in Victoria (Australia)
Shire of Murrindindi
Shepparton
Shire of Strathbogie
Shire of Mitchell
Shire of Moira